The Mercedes-Benz M06 engine is a supercharged, 6.8-liter to 7.1-liter, straight-6, internal combustion piston engine, designed, developed and produced by Mercedes-Benz; between 1928 and 1934.

M06 engine
The M06 has a supercharged, single overhead camshaft, 7-litre straight-6 engine that produces .  Depending on state of tune,  there is over 500lbs of torque, which made the SSK the fastest car of its day. A clutch operates the supercharger that is engaged by fully depressing the throttle pedal with an extra push, whereas letting off the throttle pedal disengages it.

Applications
Mercedes-Benz SSK

References

Mercedes-Benz engines
Straight-six engines
Engines by model
Gasoline engines by model